Chinnamushidiwada is a neighborhood situated on the western part of Visakhapatnam City, India. The area, which falls under the local administrative limits of Greater Visakhapatnam Municipal Corporation, is about 18 km from the Dwaraka Bus Station . Chinnamushidiwada  is located near to the Pendurthi and is served by the Visakhapatnam Bus Rapid Transit System.

Transport
APSRTC routes

References

Neighbourhoods in Visakhapatnam